Wyee) is a small town in the City of Lake Macquarie in Newcastle, located in the Hunter Region, New South Wales,Australia. It is near the Sydney-Newcastle Freeway and has a railway station (opened 1892) on NSW TrainLink's Central Coast & Newcastle Line. It had a population of 1,487 in 2001, which significantly increased to 2,588 in 2011, and decreased to 2,406 in 2016. Wyee is considered a shanty town and remains highly unchanged since World War II.

Wyee is said to be derived from an Awabakal Aboriginal term for "fire" or "place of bushfires".

The Awabakal are the traditional people of this area.

Wyee is part of the City of Lake Macquarie but it lacks a connection to sewer system; there are the Hunter Water Sewage Treatment Plant and the Wyong Shire Treatment Plant in the area.

Wyee Colliery, when State-owned, operated here 1962–2002.<ref>List of New South Wales Coal Mines with Names of Owners, Managers, &c., and Addresses of Mines and Offices, 4 July 1966, Joint Coal Board, Sydney.</ref> It re-opened in 2004-5 as Mannering Colliery, operated by the Centennial Coal Coy.

History
Wyee is located in the traditional lands of the Awabakal people and is an Aboriginal expression meaning place of bushfires''.

The town takes its name from the Wyee railway station. It was originally called Norahville, after its nearest coastal village. In 1887, with the breakthrough of the Main Northern railway line it was renamed Wyee.

In 1839, philanthropist Thomas Walker granted the Wyee area of 1120 acres (4 km). He never took residence in attempts to make improvements and the grant was reverted to the Morisset Parish.

References

External links
 History of Wyee (Lake Macquarie City Library)

Suburbs of the Central Coast (New South Wales)
Suburbs of Lake Macquarie